Vulpoxena is a genus of moths belonging to the subfamily Tortricinae of the family Tortricidae. The genus was described by John Wesley Brown in 1991.

Species
Vulpoxena dentata Razowski & Pelz, 2007
Vulpoxena falcaria Razowski & Wojtusiak, 2008
Vulpoxena separabilis Razowski & Wojtusiak, 2010
Vulpoxena vulpicoma (Meyrick, 1932)

See also
List of Tortricidae genera

References

 , 1991, Univ. Calif. Publ. Ent. 111: 23.
 , 2007: Chrysoxena-group of genera from Ecuador (Lepidoptera: Tortricidae). SHILAP Revista de Lepidopterologica 35 (137): 33–46. Full article: .
 , 2008: Eight new species of the genera Vulpoxena , Cuproxena and Bidorpitia of the Chrysoxena group of genera from Ecuador. (Lepidoptera: Tortricidae). Genus 19 (1): 113–123. Full article: 
 , 2010: Tortricidae (Lepidoptera) from Peru. Acta Zoologica Cracoviensia 53B (1-2): 73-159. . Full article: .

External links
Tortricid.net

Euliini
Tortricidae genera